Legal at Last is the eighteenth studio album by Canadian heavy metal band Anvil. It was released on February 14, 2020, through AFM Records.

Track listing

Personnel 
Anvil
 Steve "Lips" Kudlow – vocals, guitars
 Robb Reiner – drums
 Chris "Christ" Robertson – bass

Production
 Jörg Uken – producer
 Martin "Mattes" Pfeiffer – producer

References

2020 albums
Anvil (band) albums
AFM Records albums